Joaquim de Andrade Neves, Baron of Triunfo was a Brazilian general who was known for his service in the Paraguayan War.

Biography

Early Years
Neves was the son of José Joaquim de Figueiredo Neves and Francisca Ermelinda de Andrade, at the age of 19 he sat in the 5th Cavalry Regiment. Shortly thereafter, he abandoned his career to help his father on the family farm. He married Ana Carolina de Andrade Neves, with whom he had three children: Maria Adelaide de Andrade Neves, José Joaquim de Andrade Neves Filho and Luiz Carlos de Andrade Neves. He was the grandfather of José Joaquim de Andrade Neves Neto .

Military career
In 1835, when the Ragamuffin War broke out, Andrade Neves left agriculture, enlisting as a volunteer on the imperial side. He took an active part in a large number of battles as a member of the National Guard, having distinguished himself in the attack on the island of Fanfa on the Jacuí River, where Bento Gonçalves da Silva was taken prisoner. In the combat of Taquari Andrade Neves he received two bullet wounds, however he remained on the battlefield until the end of the fight. Always equipped with a spear and at the head of his squadrons, he served the cause of legality with unsurpassed bravery, until the Treaty of Poncho Verde.

Neves was then promoted to Major of the National Guard in 1840 and Lieutenant Colonel in 1841. From ensign to lieutenant colonel, he earned all the posts on the battlefield through acts of bravery. For his bravery he was invited to join the Imperial Brazilian Army.

After a brief period of agriculture life and peace in the countryside, he returned to arms to fight in the Platine War, in 1851, gathering a group of volunteers, standing out in the Battle of Moron.

In 1864, at the time of the Brazilian invasion of the Oriental Republic of Uruguay, to defend Brazilian life and interests, General Andrade Neves was at the head of the 3rd Cavalry Brigade. On the Great Siege of Montevideo, he was assigned to attack the Cerro fortress. The 3rd Brigade advanced and the garrison raised a white flag on the battlements of the wall. With the campaign in Uruguay concluding, by the treaty of February 20, 1865, the Imperial Brazilian Army marches on its way to Paraguay. The Brazilians entered Paraguayan territory in 1867. In the Battle of Tuiucué on July 16, 1867, its divisions take the trench Punta Carapá , dragging the Paraguayans in defeat to Humaitá. On August 3, he defeated seven hundred Paraguayan soldiers in Arroio Hondo .

On September 20, the Brazilians captured the city of Pilar. On October 3, the Neves and his men defended the city of São Solano and on October 21, they attacked four Paraguayan cavalry regiments and defeated them. Their division was dubbed by the Paraguayans as the Loca de Cuenta (crazy swept cavalry). Because of this victory he was recognized as Baron of Triunfo on October 19, 1867.

.

From 1868 he made several reconnaissances to help in the Siege of Humaitá, at the same time he took over the fortress's Establishment which was defended by fifteen cannons and supported by two ships with artillery, in addition to two ditches and mouths. Under heavy losses, he was wounded and had his horse killed, had his cavalry troops dismounted and attacked the fortress until he took it. Neves then participated in the Battle of Avaí. He commanded the troops that attacked Lomas Valentinas from the left, managing to take them inside the fortified position, but in the middle of the position, a bullet came to produce a serious wound in his foot. Taken to Asunción, he was taken to the palace taken from Solano López. In the delirium of the fever that devoured him, under that fiery climate, legend has it that the brave general, as if in that tragic moment a Spartan soul had animated him, thought that he was still ahead of his squadrons and, throwing down the covers, waved: " Comrades!... one more load!" José Joaquim de Andrade Neves died in the palace on January 6, 1869.

Legacy

He is honored by two streets in the state capital, and one street in the metropolitan region of Porto Alegre: Rua Andrade Neves, in the city center, Rua Barão do Triunfo, in the Menino Deus neighborhood, and Rua Gen Andrade Neves, in the Harmonia district, in Canoas. In Joinville, in the state of Santa Catarina, there is also a street, in the noble neighborhood of América, which bears its title as its name, Rua General Andrade Neves. Also in Belo Horizonte, in the Gutiérrez district, there is Rua General Andrade Neves.

The city of Rio Grande do Sul, Barão do Triunfo, is named after him.

In addition, the streets General Andrade Neves, in the  neighborhood in the municipality of Niterói, the Rua Andrade Neves, in the Tijuca neighborhood, in the municipality of Rio de Janeiro, the Rua General Andrade Neves in the Vila Urussaí neighborhood, in the municipality of Duque de Caxias, and also in Petrópolis, there is a street titled Rua Barão do Triunfo, in the Ingelheim Quarter, all in the state of Rio de Janeiro . In the city of São Paulo, the Barão do Triunfo street, a very tree-lined street in the Brooklin neighborhood. In Campinas, one of the main avenues of the city, which connects the old railway station (today the Estação Cultura) to the Castelo district, receives its name. In João Pessoa there is the Barão do Triunfo avenue located in the Varadouro district.

In his hometown, Rio Pardo names the most important street in the city: Avenida Andrade Neves. Gaucho cities such as Santa Maria (Rio Grande do Sul), Pelotas, Cachoeira do Sul and Canguçu also have streets in his honor. Besides these, there are still many others in the interior of Rio Grande do Sul .

He was, for decades, seen as an icon within the patron of the Brazilian Cavalry.

References

Bibliography
FRANCO, Sérgio da Costa. Guia Histórico de Porto Alegre, 4a edição, Editora da Universidade (UFRGS), Porto Alegre, 2006.
MACEDO, Joaquim Manuel de, Anno biographico brazileiro (v.1), Typographia e litographia do imperial instituto artístico, Rio de Janeiro, 1876.

1807 births
1869 deaths
Brazilian military personnel of the Paraguayan War
Brazilian nobility
19th-century Brazilian military personnel
People from Rio Grande do Sul